Rhytidophyllum leucomallon is a species of plant in the family Gesneriaceae, endemic to Hispaniola. According to Liogier it can be found in the Dominican Republic (Banano, from Pedernales to El Aceitillar, S. Jose de Ocoa) and in Haiti (Massif de la Hotte, Massif de la Selle, Gonâve Island).

References

leucomallon
Flora of Haiti
Flora of the Dominican Republic
Flora without expected TNC conservation status